Niké Handball Extraliga is the highest league in the league system of Slovak Handball and comprises the top 11 Slovak handball teams. The first season began in 1993-94.

Structure
The season starts in the end of September with a regular season comprising 8 teams meeting each other twice. The 4 best teams after the regular season qualifies for the play-off.
The season ends with a single final in the end of April.

Current teams

Teams for season 2022–23

MŠK Považská Bystrica
HT Tatran Prešov 
HK Kúpele Bojnice
TJ Štart Nové Zámky
HK Košice 
HC Sporta Hlohovec 
ŠKP Bratislava
HK agro Topoľčany
Záhoráci Stupava 
Slovan Modra
MHáK Martin

Past champions

 1994 : Lokomotiva Trnava
 1995 : Agro VTJ Topoľčany
 1996 : Agro VTJ Topoľčany (2)
 1997 : VSŽ Košice
 1998 : Agro VTJ Topoľčany (3)
 1999 : VSŽ Košice (2)
 2000 : ŠKP Sečovce
 2001 : ŠKP Sečovce (2)
 2002 : MŠK Považská Bystrica
 2003 : MŠK Považská Bystrica (2)

 2004 : HT Tatran Prešov
 2005 : HT Tatran Prešov (2)
 2006 : MŠK Považská Bystrica (3)
 2007 : HT Tatran Prešov (3)
 2008 : HT Tatran Prešov (4)
 2009 : HT Tatran Prešov (5)
 2010 : HT Tatran Prešov (6)
 2011 : HT Tatran Prešov (7)
 2012 : HT Tatran Prešov (8)
 2013 : HT Tatran Prešov (9)

 2014 : HT Tatran Prešov (10)
 2015 : HT Tatran Prešov (11)
 2016 : HT Tatran Prešov (12)
 2017 : HT Tatran Prešov (13)
 2018 : HT Tatran Prešov (14)
 2019 : HT Tatran Prešov (15)
 2020 : not awarded
 2021 : HT Tatran Prešov (16)
 2022 : HT Tatran Prešov (17)

External links
Slovak handball association

Handball in Slovakia
Slovakia
Professional sports leagues in Slovakia